Yuma Proving Ground is a census-designated place (CDP) covering the residential population of the Yuma Proving Ground in Yuma County, Arizona. 

It first appeared as a CDP in the 2020 Census with a population of 313.

Demographics

2020 census

Note: the US Census treats Hispanic/Latino as an ethnic category. This table excludes Latinos from the racial categories and assigns them to a separate category. Hispanics/Latinos can be of any race.

References

Census-designated places in Yuma County, Arizona